The 2018–19 Primeira Liga (also known as Liga NOS for sponsorship reasons) was the 85th season of the Primeira Liga, the top professional league for Portuguese association football clubs. Porto were the defending champions but finished behind Benfica, who became champions for a record 37th time while equalling their own scoring record of 103 goals in the 1963–64 season.

Incidents
The weeks leading up to the beginning of the competition were filled with several incidents:

 Contrary to previous seasons, three teams will be relegated. This is due to the fact that Gil Vicente was granted a place in the 2019–20 Primeira Liga season by court decision. Gil Vicente argued against this solution since the club claimed for an immediate integration in the first tier (possibly with an enlargement to 20 participating teams).

 Académico de Viseu, which had finished third in 2017–18 LigaPro, claimed that runners-up Santa Clara should be punished for irregularities occurred in several games of the season. This would prevent Santa Clara to be promoted to the 2018–2019 Primeira Liga, hence Académico de Viseu would take its place.

 Following the incidents in Sporting CP's training centre, during which players and staff were attacked by the club's ultras, nine players unilaterally revoked their contracts. Ultimately, after the president's impeachment (as he was accused of being responsible for those occurrences), the club was able to convince some of those players to return. Nevertheless, the new administration always admitted that the club would start the season in an early preparation phase.

 On 30 June, following disputes over the administration of the football section, Belenenses broke the relationship with the publicly traded company who owned the football section (in Portuguese, SAD - as for sociedade anónima desportiva). Nevertheless, Codecity Sports Management, the owners of Belenenses's football Inc., decided to keep business and placed an entering in Primeira Liga under the name "Belenenses SAD", using Estádio Nacional as home stadium. In October, the intellectual property court issued an obligation for the team owned by Codecity Sports Management to rebrand, dismissing every trademark connection with Clube de Futebol "Os Belenenses" but the society did not follow and appealed the decision. The original club made a fresh start, entering a team in the bottom division of Lisbon FA (6th tier), keeping the support of a vast majority of the fans.

Teams

Stadia and locations

Personnel and sponsors

Managerial changes

Season summary

League table

Positions by round

Results

Statistics

Top goalscorers

  A former Portuguese international player at youth levels, Eduardo switched allegiances to play for Angola during the season.

Top assists

Hat-tricks

Awards

Monthly awards

Annual awards
Annual awards were announced on 5 July 2019.

References

Primeira Liga seasons
Port
1